Simone Bolelli and David Vega Hernández were the defending champions but chose not to defend their title.

Szymon Walków and Tristan-Samuel Weissborn won the title after defeating Harri Heliövaara and Alex Lawson 6–1, 4–6, [10–8] in the final.

Seeds

Draw

References

External links
 Main draw

Sánchez-Casal Cup - Doubles